Blues for Dracula is the debut album by American jazz drummer Philly Joe Jones which was recorded in 1958 for the Riverside label.

Reception

The Allmusic review by Scott Yanow described it as a "worthwhile but not overly essential release". It features Jones's vocal impersonation of Bela Lugosi. The album "became an instant classic thanks to the title track."

Track listing
 "Blues for Dracula" (Johnny Griffin) - 8:11
 "Trick Street"  (Owen Marshall) - 3:47    
 "Fiesta" (Cal Massey) - 10:25    
 "Tune-Up" (Miles Davis) - 8:00    
 "Ow!" (Dizzy Gillespie) - 12:08

Personnel 
Philly Joe Jones - drums, narrator
Nat Adderley - cornet
Julian Priester - trombone
Johnny Griffin - tenor saxophone
Tommy Flanagan - piano
Jimmy Garrison - bass

References 

1958 debut albums
Philly Joe Jones albums
Albums produced by Orrin Keepnews
Riverside Records albums